Emre Tezgel (born 19 September 2005) is an English professional footballer who plays as a forward for Stoke City.

Club career
Tezgel made his professional debut for Stoke City on 9 January 2022 in a 2–0 FA Cup victory over Leyton Orient becoming Stoke's youngest player. On 29 June 2022, Tezgel signed as a scholar and also agreed to a three-year professional contract which took effect on his 17th birthday.

International career
In June 2021 Tezgel scored a hat-trick for England under-16 against Northern Ireland.

Personal life
Tezgel is of Turkish descent through his father with roots in Aksaray. He attended Painsley Catholic College. His cousin Tash played for Stoke City Women.

Career statistics

References

2005 births
Living people
Footballers from Staffordshire
English footballers
England youth international footballers
English people of Turkish descent
Stoke City F.C. players
Association football forwards
English Football League players